Lon Allen Scott (September 25, 1888 – February 11, 1931) was an American politician who served as a United States Representative from Tennessee as a Republican.

Biography

Lon Allen Scott was born on a farm near Cypress Inn in Wayne County, Tennessee to Mattie G. Cash and Daniel Egan Scott on September 25, 1888. His family moved to Savannah, Tennessee in Hardin County and he attended the public schools and Savannah Tennessee Institute. In 1915 he graduated from the law department of Cumberland University in Lebanon, Tennessee.

Engaging in mercantile pursuits, the real estate, and the lumber business, Scott also became a member of the Tennessee House of Representatives, and served in that capacity from 1913 to 1917. He served as the Republican minority floor leader from 1915 to 1917. He represented Tennessee in the prosecution of Attorney General Estes in an impeachment proceeding before the Tennessee Senate.

Scott resigned as a state representative to as a private during the First World War. He was later promoted to a lieutenancy.

Elected as a Republican to the Sixty-seventh Congress, Scott served from March 4, 1921 to March 3, 1923. He was an unsuccessful candidate for re-election in 1922 to the Sixty-eighth Congress. He resumed his former business pursuits and resided in Savannah, Tennessee until his death.

On February 11, 1931 he died in Savannah, Tennessee after being sick for three months and was interred at Savannah Cemetery.

References

External links 
 

 

1888 births
1931 deaths
Republican Party members of the Tennessee House of Representatives
People from Savannah, Tennessee
Republican Party members of the United States House of Representatives from Tennessee
20th-century American politicians
United States Army personnel of World War I
United States Army officers